Drassyllus is a genus of ground spiders that was first described by R. V. Chamberlin in 1922.

Species
 it contains ninety-four species:

D. adocetus Chamberlin, 1936 – USA
D. adullam Levy, 2009 – Israel
D. alachua Platnick & Shadab, 1982 – USA
D. amamiensis Kamura, 2011 – Japan
D. antonito Platnick & Shadab, 1982 – USA, Mexico
D. aprilinus (Banks, 1904) – USA, Mexico
D. arizonensis (Banks, 1901) – USA, Mexico
D. baccus Platnick & Shadab, 1982 – Mexico
D. barbus Platnick, 1984 – USA
D. biglobus Paik, 1986 – Russia (Far East), Korea
D. broussardi Platnick & Horner, 2007 – USA
D. callus Platnick & Shadab, 1982 – Mexico
D. carbonarius (O. Pickard-Cambridge, 1872) – Israel
D. cerrus Platnick & Shadab, 1982 – USA
D. chibus Platnick & Shadab, 1982 – Mexico
D. coajus Platnick & Shadab, 1982 – Mexico
D. conformans Chamberlin, 1936 – USA, Mexico
D. coreanus Paik, 1986 – China, Korea
D. covensis Exline, 1962 – USA
D. creolus Chamberlin & Gertsch, 1940 – USA, Canada
D. crimeaensis Kovblyuk, 2003 – Macedonia, Greece, Ukraine, Turkey, Russia (Europe, Caucasus), Azerbaijan
D. cyprius Chatzaki & Russell-Smith, 2017 – Cyprus
D. dadia Komnenov & Chatzaki, 2016 – Greece, Turkey
D. depressus (Emerton, 1890) – USA, Canada, Korea
D. dixinus Chamberlin, 1922 – USA
D. dromeus Chamberlin, 1922 – USA, Canada
D. durango Platnick & Shadab, 1982 – Mexico
D. ellipes Chamberlin & Gertsch, 1940 – USA
D. eremitus Chamberlin, 1922 – USA, Canada
D. eremophilus Chamberlin & Gertsch, 1940 – USA, Canada
D. eurus Platnick & Shadab, 1982 – USA
D. excavatus (Schenkel, 1963) – China
D. fallens Chamberlin, 1922 (type) – USA, Canada
D. fractus Chamberlin, 1936 – USA
D. fragilis Ponomarev, 2008 – Kazakhstan
D. frigidus (Banks, 1892) – USA
D. gammus Platnick & Shadab, 1982 – Mexico
D. gynosaphes Chamberlin, 1936 – USA
D. huachuca Platnick & Shadab, 1982 – USA
D. inanus Chamberlin & Gertsch, 1940 – USA
D. insularis (Banks, 1900) – North America
D. jabalpurensis Gajbe, 2005 – India
D. jubatopalpis Levy, 1998 – Turkey, Israel
D. khajuriai Tikader & Gajbe, 1976 – India
D. lamprus (Chamberlin, 1920) – North America
D. lepidus (Banks, 1899) – USA, Mexico
D. louisianus Chamberlin, 1922 – USA
D. lutetianus (L. Koch, 1866) – Europe to Kazakhstan
D. mahabalei Tikader, 1982 – India
D. mazus Platnick & Shadab, 1982 – Mexico
D. mexicanus (Banks, 1898) – USA, Mexico
D. mirus Platnick & Shadab, 1982 – Mexico
D. mormon Chamberlin, 1936 – USA, Mexico
D. mumai Gertsch & Riechert, 1976 – USA, Mexico
D. nannellus Chamberlin & Gertsch, 1940 – USA, Canada
D. niger (Banks, 1896) – USA, Canada
D. notonus Chamberlin, 1928 – USA, Mexico
D. novus (Banks, 1895) – USA, Canada
D. ojus Platnick & Shadab, 1982 – USA, Mexico
D. orgilus Chamberlin, 1922 – USA, Mexico
D. orlando Platnick & Corey, 1989 – USA
D. pantherius Hu & Wu, 1989 – China
D. platnicki Gajbe, 1987 – India
D. praeficus (L. Koch, 1866) – Europe to Central Asia
D. proclesis Chamberlin, 1922 – USA
D. prosaphes Chamberlin, 1936 – USA, Mexico
D. pseudovinealis Kim, Yoo & Lee, 2018 – Korea
D. puebla Platnick & Shadab, 1982 – Mexico
D. pumiloides Chatzaki, 2003 – Greece (Crete)
D. pumilus (C. L. Koch, 1839) – Europe to Central Asia
D. pusillus (C. L. Koch, 1833) – Europe, Turkey, Caucasus, Russia (Europe to Far East), Central Asia, China
D. ratnagiriensis Tikader & Gajbe, 1976 – India
D. rufulus (Banks, 1892) – USA, Canada
D. salton Platnick & Shadab, 1982 – USA
D. sanmenensis Platnick & Song, 1986 – Russia (Far East), China, Korea, Japan
D. saphes Chamberlin, 1936 – North America
D. sasakawai Kamura, 1987 – Korea, Japan
D. seminolus Chamberlin & Gertsch, 1940 – USA
D. shaanxiensis Platnick & Song, 1986 – Russia (Caucasus) to China, Korea, Japan
D. sinton Platnick & Shadab, 1982 – USA, Mexico
D. socius Chamberlin, 1922 – USA, Canada
D. sonus Platnick & Shadab, 1982 – Mexico
D. sur Tuneva & Esyunin, 2003 – Turkey, Russia (Europe, Urals), Kazakhstan, Iran
D. talus Platnick & Shadab, 1982 – Mexico
D. tepus Platnick & Shadab, 1982 – Mexico
D. texamans Chamberlin, 1936 – USA, Mexico
D. tinus Platnick & Shadab, 1982 – Mexico
D. villicoides (Giltay, 1932) – Greece
D. villicus (Thorell, 1875) – Europe, Azerbaijan
D. villus Platnick & Shadab, 1982 – Mexico
D. vinealis (Kulczyński, 1897) – Central to Eastern Europe, Turkey, Caucasus, Russia (Europe to Far East), Kazakhstan, China, Korea, Japan
D. yaginumai Kamura, 1987 – Korea, Japan
D. yunnanensis Platnick & Song, 1986 – China, Myanmar
D. zimus Platnick & Shadab, 1982 – Mexico

References

Araneomorphae genera
Gnaphosidae